East Cracroft Island is an island in the Johnstone Strait region of the Central Coast region of British Columbia, Canada. It is the smaller of the two Cracroft Islands, and at low tide is really one island with its larger neighbour, West Cracroft Island. On the south side of the shallows that form an isthmus between them at low tide is Port Harvey, which is a short, wide inlet or bay.

The Cacroft Islands were named for Sophia Cracroft, niece of Sir John Franklin. She visited the British Columbia with Lady Franklin in 1861.  Nearby Sophia Island is named for her as well.

The island is separated from the mainland on its northwest by Chatham Channel, which leads from Knight Inlet to the entrance to Call Inlet which is to the east.  Havannah Passage leads from the opening of Call Inlet south then west along the south side of the Cracroft Islands to Johnstone Strait.  Hull Island is off East Cracroft's southeast in the Havannah Channel.  On the island's north, separating it from Minstrel Island, is a narrows called The Blow Hole.

See also
List of islands of British Columbia

References

Islands of British Columbia
Central Coast of British Columbia